"Seven" is the 11th single by Mika Nakashima. It was used as the Kanebo Kate CM song. It reached #3 on the Oricon charts and charted for seven weeks, selling around 53,000 units.

Track listing
 Seven
 Seven (Coldfeet Remix)
 Venus in the Dark (Coldfeet Remix)
 Seven (Instrumental)

References

2004 singles
Mika Nakashima songs
Songs written by Mika Nakashima
2004 songs